China–São Tomé and Príncipe relations refers to the diplomatic relations between the People's Republic of China and São Tomé and Príncipe. Both nations are members of the United Nations.

History 
In 1997, São Tomé and Príncipe established diplomatic relations with the Republic of China. However, in 2013, the People's Republic of China established a trade office in São Tomé and Príncipe, and the next year President Manuel Pinto da Costa visited China in a private capacity.

Bilateral relations between São Tomé and Príncipe and Taiwan were terminated on 21 December 2016. On December 26, 2017, São Tomé and Príncipe re-established diplomatic relations with China, and a Chinese embassy was opened in the capital in April 2017. Beijing moved swiftly to provide substantial aid to the archipelago previously provided by Taiwan. In January 2017, the two nations signed a 5-year co‑operation agreement prioritizing areas including tourism, infrastructure, technology, agriculture and fisheries, student scholarships and medical assistance. The Economist reports that Chinese leader "Xi Jinping declared that China was ready to expand co‑operation to maritime security to combat piracy and transnational organised crime." Sao Tome leader Trovoada confirmed that Chinese aid would include grants, direct budget support and a cancellation of US$17.3 million in bilateral debt.

On April 25, 2017, Mr Trovoada disclosed that China would also provide São Tomé with a grant of US$146m for infrastructure projects such as the modernisation of São Tomé International Airport and the construction of a deep‑sea container port, which could serve as a logistic hub for Chinese exports to Central Africa.

In February 2020, China's commitment to infrastructure development in São Tomé and Príncipe reached new heights as they promised to fund the expansion of São Tomé and Príncipe's international airport. The project is estimated to cost roughly US$31 million.

See also
 São Tomé and Príncipe–Taiwan relations
Belt and Road Initiative
Politics of São Tomé and Príncipe

References

 
São Tomé and Príncipe
São Tomé and Príncipe
Bilateral relations of São Tomé and Príncipe